Sydney Crooks is a founder and original member of the Jamaican vocal trio The Pioneers.

Biography
Sydney Crooks was born on 24 February 1945 in Westmoreland in western Jamaica, where he studied elementary school. He then moved to Kingston at age 14. He worked as a clerk at a construction tool shop. He started singing at youth clubs in the same city. It was then that he decided to form the vocal trio The Pioneers.

Sydney Crooks founder member and only original Pioneers member still left in the group has been through many formations with the group. The first Pioneers were Sydney Crooks and his brother Derrick Crooks. The second formation was Sydney Crooks, Derrick Crooks and Winston Hewitt. The third formation was Sydney Crooks, Glen Adams. The forth formation was Sydney Crooks and Leroy Sibbles. The fifth formation was Sydney Crook and Jackie Robinson. The six formation was Sydney Crooks, Jackie Robinson and Dennis Walks. The seventh formation was Sydney Crooks, George Dekker and Jackie Robinson. The first song The Pioneers ever done was call "Good Nanny" and it was done by only him and his brother Derrick Crooks, which introduce The Pioneers singing group to Jamaica and the world of reggae.

The first formation song the sang call "Good Nanny". The second formation song the sang call "I'll never come running back to you no more". The third formation song the sang call " Shake it up".  The forth formation song the sang call "Give it to me". The fifth formation song the sang call" Give me little loving". The six formation song the sang call " Having a part". The seventh formation song the sang call" Never see come see".

Sydney Crooks met the legendary Joe Gibbs, producer and executive, who asked him to record "Give Me a Loving Litlle" while he recorded the song he needed a backing vocal and as they usually do in Jamaica they went round the door of the studio and found the current member of the vocal trio Jackie Robinson sitting on a rock, and was invited by Sydney Crooks aka Norris Cole to assist in music, and did so successfully, and was immediately invited to join the group. And then the trio was back, and they had a string of hits in Jamaica such as "Long Shot Bus Me Bit", "Catch the Jackpot" by Amalgamated Records and today's record label Joe Gibbs Reggae Music and Stone Reggae Music. But he did not stop there, working with the group went to work with Leslie Kong (the producer of Bob Marley and Jimmy Cliff) and then the success came true. The first record he made under this new label, became the first Hit number one in Jamaica, and at the end of the same year he hit the list of most performed in England reaching the 3rd place in the charts. In November 1969, a group of executives from one of England's largest record companies at Creole Records saw the group performing in Jamaica with two major American Blues singers, Joe Simon, Sydney Crooks aka Norris Cole / Luddy Pioneer and their group performed so well that they were invited to do a tounet through England. Meanwhile, the "Long Shot" song "Kicked the Bucket" made progress among the rest of England.

In November 1969, they were immediately invited to make one of two most popular TV shows in Europe Top of the Pops performing very well. And then they started the long Tounet, their dream come true when they came on stage with John Lennon, Yoko Ono and his band at the English High School in London! "As a kid out of the Jamaican shantytown, Norris Cole takes pride in squeezing you into the hands of one of the greatest musicians, producers and singers of all time. Biggest success reached when they made a version of Jimmy Cliff's song "Let your Yeah Yeah Yeah", which reached the fifth place in the British charts and first place in all of Europe. It was then that they were invited to make the most popular TV program of "Germany" Hits a Go Go".

While in Germany they received a call from their label that at the time was Trojan Records saying they had been invited to do a tounet for Japan. And then they were sent to Japan being the first reggae band to perform in this country. tounet of success by Japan, were sent to the Middle East. Sydney Crooks / Norris Cole, Frankie Diamond, Luddy Pioneer, Luddy Crooks as they are called, always busy in the musical area writing or producing many artists such as Gregory Isaacs, Márcia Griffts (from The Wailers group), Carlene Davis, Owen Gray, Eric Donaldson, Winston Groove, Johnny Orlando, Dennis Brown, Donna Marie, The Pioneers, Jackie Brown, George Dekker, Tyrone Taylor, Brent Dowe, Freddy Mckay, Dennis Alcapone, Delroy Wilson, Justin Hinds, Alton Ellis. Lloyd Parks, Eclips Band, George Faith and many others.

To go a little further, Sydney Crooks, Luddy Pioneer, Norris Cole, is one of the first Jamaican reggae singer, composer and producer to set foot in Japan, singing and producing reggae music.

He did it five years before Bob Marley.

Sydney Crooks is responsible for the rise of many of Jamaica's best artists.

Artists like Gregory Isaacs, that is, All I Have is Love, album produced by Sydney Crooks, that obtained great success in the whole world.

For the record book of reggae, Sydney Crooks the same Luddy Pioneer aka Norris Cole, is considered one of the largest producers in Jamaica, contributes greatly to the success of Jamaican music.

It has an almost endless list, with names of artists that already produced.

Marcia Griffiths,(from The Wailers) the album Rock my Soul, Gregory Isaacs, Carlene Davis, Owen Gray, Eric Donaldson, Winston Groove, Johnny Orlando, Dennis Brown, Donna Marie, The Pioneers, Jackie Brown, George Dekker, Tyrone Taylor, Brent Dowe, Freddy Mckay, Dennis Alcapone, Delroy Wilson, Justin Hinds, Alton Ellis, Lloyd Parks, Eclips Band, George Faith, Don Campbell, and the list goes on ...........

Sydney Crooks & The Pioneers also shared stage with one of the greatest singers of all time; his idol John Lennon.

Almost all the artists who passed through the Recording Studio of the late Joe Gibbs passed through the hands of Norris Cole. Artists like Culture, Horace Andy, Pablo Augustus, Stanley Beckford, The Versatiles, Junior Biles and many others.

Some of Jamaica's greatest engineers, such as David Rowe, Roan Richards, Carlos Gray, Carl Toppin, worked under the supervision of Sydney Crooks.

Sydney Crooks, along with the other two Pioneers, worked together on a major project with the UB40 group and donated royalties from the song written by Sydney Crooks, George Dekker and Jackie Robinson, to feed the starving children of Africa.

Sydney Crook, Luddy Pioneer Crooks, Norris Cole was adopted by the Maranhão (Brazil) as his second home. It has been a long time between Jamaica and Brazil/Maranhão. He is married with Brazilian/Maranhense Lady Conceição and together has a 15-year-old son, Norris Cole Junior. He has also opened his studio in São Luís Maranhão-Brazil, the "Pioneer International Recording Studio" and his hope is to help raise many singers reggae music from Brazil, such as his wife Lady Conceição also a singer and his son Norris Cole Jr, who teamed up with the legendary singer of the group The Congos, Cedric Myton, to make his first video clip entitled "War inna Babylon," which is now seen all over the world.

Sydney Crooks has a large fan base, especially in the north of Brazil and in the interior of Maranhão.

Sydney Crooks, Luddy Pioneer, Norris Cole, recently released a great album Peace Justice Liberty, this album rescues the roots of the group and the artist himself as a solo singer in fantastic instrumental and vocals very well placed by Norris Cole and Pioneers.

Some of the best and most important Jamaican musicians of all history participated in the recording, among them: bassist Lloyd Parks, guitarist Mikey Chung, keyboardist Lloyd "Obeah" Denton and saxophonist Dean Fraser.
With fourteen tracks of pure roots reggae and lyrics ranging from lovers rock to the traditional social critics that reggae does, the album was considered one of the best releases of recent years in the genre. For the artist who records since 1965 this is the thirteenth album of the solo career with the name Norris Cole, and arguably one of the best of his career.

Sydney Crooks is very active in Brazil, working behind the scenes, with his wife in front interacting.

Producing and writing music until today. He as a boy from a small country left to live next to prince and princess. Sydney Crooks was one of the first Jamaican blacks to live in the same area as Princess Diana in the seventies, until she was regularly followed to her home by the British police in Kensington, London; because when he drove to his house at night police followed him thinking he was a thief entering his own house at Kelso Place in Kensington, as his home was behind the house of Princess Diana's (Place) Sydney Crooks boyfriend says have nothing to prove to anyone. Sydney Crooks, Luddy Pioneer aka Norris Cole, as always a busy person in the music business writing or producing himself and many artist. He still has a lot of talent left in him.

References

External links
Sidney Crooks at Roots Archives
 Sydney Crooks his undercosntruction website.

1945 births
Living people
People from Westmoreland Parish
Jamaican reggae singers
Jamaican male singers
Jamaican record producers
Jamaican expatriates in England